Johann Alexander Thiele (26 March 1685 in Erfurt – 22 May 1752 in Dresden) was a German painter and engraver.

Life and work 
After five years of apprenticeship as a printer in Erfurt, he was married in Arnstadt in 1710 and moved to Dresden in 1715, where he copied old paintings, was a student of Christoph Ludwig Agricola and worked briefly with Adam Manyoki, although he remained largely an auto-didact. In 1722, he presented his paintings for the first time during a carnival held at the Zwinger Palace. Many of his works were purchased by the former Saxon Minister of War, Jacob Heinrich von Flemming.

After Flemming's death in 1728, Thiele returned to Arnstadt. In 1729, he became court painter to Günther XLIII, Prince of Schwarzburg-Sondershausen, but he also worked for the courts in Braunschweig and Kassel. In 1738, he was named court painter for King Augustus III of Poland and, in 1740, acquired the patronage of Heinrich von Brühl. During this period, he received 1000 Thalers and free lodging for creating four landscape views of the Eastern Ore Mountains and Mount Oybin in the Zittau Mountains, as well as some of the first paintings of the Lößnitz region.

Unfortunately, 1740 was also the year when his wife died. After completing his commission, in 1743, he remarried and was awarded the title of "Hofkommissar" (Court Inspector). Six years later, he commissioned to do another series of landscapes; this time of Mecklenburg, under the direction of Duke Christian Ludwig II.

Three years after his death, the art historian and collector Christian Ludwig von Hagedorn wrote his biography (although it appears to be unavailable at present). His son, also became a well-known landscape painter.

References

Further reading 
 Moritz Stubel, Der Landschaftsmaler Johann Alexander Thiele und seine sächsischen Prospekt, B.C. Teubner, 1914 
 Hendrik Bärnighausen, et al. "Wie über die Natur die Kunst des Pinsels steigt": Johann Alexander Thiele (1685-1752) : Thüringer Prospekte und Landschafts-Inventionen, Volume 2 of Sondershäuser Kataloge, Hain, 2003

External links 

ArtNet: More works by Thiele.
 

1685 births
1752 deaths
German male painters
Landscape painters
Artists from Erfurt